Talvana or Tanvana is a village in Mandvi Taluka of Kutch district of Gujarat, India.

Many years ago, to spread Islam, when Syed Ruknoodinshah came out of the Shindh area of Pakistan, 

he fought with some Dhal Rajputs, robbers, later he was martyred, 

his grave is in this village, where there is a big dargah, his Along with his sister and other companion's dargah is also present. 

there was nothing in this village 400-450 years ago,from Mandvi to this it was all barren land and only wild area, 

it is said that people started settling here after their arrival. And finally this village was formed, 

there are big tamarind and peepal trees near this dargah, there the "hala" priests do cleaning and guarding their dargah, 

once a year there is the biggest fair which is the second number of Kutch. It is considered a fair.

The fairs are held on the first Mondays of Chaitra (April–May) and Bhadrapad (September–October). At the spring fair, when it lasts for two days, the number of pilgrims, most of whom are Cutch Muslims, averages from 10,000 to 15,000, and at the autumn fair when it lasts for one day, the number averages from 3000 to 4000. 

In the neighbourhood is a pond whose water is believed to cure hydrophobia and other diseases, to make the barren fruitful, and to give success in trade. 

Fair arrangements, formerly in the hands of the "hala" of this village,

References

Villages in Kutch district